"Dirty Water" is a single by The Blackeyed Susans, released in July, 1994, from their 1993 album, All Souls Alive. The last four tracks are taken from the cassette album Hard Liquor, Soft Music by The Blackeyed Susans Trio.

Track listing 

 "Dirty Water" (Phil Kakulas, Peggy Van Zalm) – 4:54
 "Trouble" (Phil Kakulas, Tim Rollinson) – 3:26
 "20/20 Vision" (Joe Allison, Milton Estes) – 3:21
 "Happiness" (Appel) – 3:40
 "Lonesome Town" (Baker Knight) – 3:24

Personnel

Track 1
 Rob Snarski – vocals
 Phil Kakulas – electric bass
 Graham Lee – electric and acoustic guitars, backing vocals
 Warren Ellis – violin, organ
 Jim White – drums
 Mark C Halstead – backing vocals

Tracks 2-5
 Rob Snarski – vocals, acoustic guitar
 Phil Kakulas – double bass
 Graham Lee – pedal steel, backing vocals, electric guitars, lead vocals on track 3
Recorded by Andy Parsons at Fortissimo Studios, Melbourne, late 1993

References

The Blackeyed Susans songs
1994 singles
1993 songs
Shock Records singles